Laura Kamdop (born 14 September 1990) is a French-born Senegalese handball player for Fleury Loiret HB and the Senegalese national team.

She competed at the 2019 World Women's Handball Championship in Japan.

Achievements
EHF Cup Winners' Cup:
Finalist: 2015
Slovenian First League:
Winner: 2017
Slovenian Cup:
Winner: 2017
Coupe de France:
Winner: 2014
Coupe de la Ligue:
Winner: 2015, 2016

See also
List of sportspeople who competed for more than one nation

References

External links

1990 births
Living people
Senegalese female handball players
Sportspeople from Chartres
Expatriate handball players
Sportspeople from Eure-et-Loir
French expatriate sportspeople in Slovenia
French female handball players
Black French sportspeople
French sportspeople of Senegalese descent
Senegalese expatriate sportspeople in Slovenia